Turčianska Štiavnička is a village and municipality in Martin District in the Žilina Region of northern Slovakia.

History
In historical records the village was first mentioned in 1474.

Geography
The municipality lies at an altitude of 435 metres and covers an area of 14.072 km². It has a population of about 802 people.

External links
 http://www.statistics.sk/mosmis/eng/run.html

Villages and municipalities in Martin District
Révay family